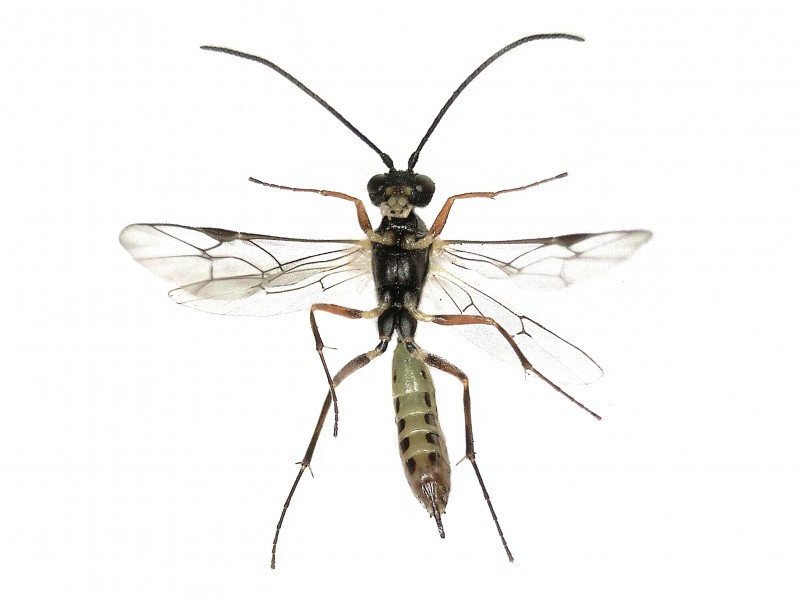
- Stilbops vetulus

Scientific classification
- Kingdom: Animalia
- Phylum: Arthropoda
- Class: Insecta
- Order: Hymenoptera
- Family: Ichneumonidae
- Genus: Stilbops; Förster, 1869

Synonyms
- List: Aphanoroptra Thomson, 1877; Aphanoroptrum Förster, 1869; Aphanorrhoptrum Dalla Torre, 1901; Eritrachynus Schmiedeknecht, 1913

= Stilbops =

Genus of wasps

Stilbops is a genus of parasitoid wasps belonging to the family Ichneumonidae.

The species of this genus are found in Europe and Japan.

== Species ==
The following species are recognised in the genus Stilbops:

- Stilbops acicularis Kasparyan, 1998
- Stilbops asper (Schmiedeknecht, 1913)
- Stilbops auster Watanabe & Maeto, 2012
- Stilbops belokobylskii Kasparyan & Kuslitzky, 1999
- Stilbops cavigena Kasparyan, 1984
- Stilbops coeloclypeus Watanabe & Maeto, 2012
- Stilbops ezoensis Watanabe & Maeto, 2012
- Stilbops femoralis Kasparyan, 1999
- Stilbops fuscipennis Kasparyan, 1984
- Stilbops gorokhovi Kasparyan, 1999
- Stilbops japonicus Watanabe & Maeto, 2012
- Stilbops kunashiricus Kasparyan, 1999
- Stilbops kuslitzkii Kasparyan, 1984
- Stilbops latibasis Townes, 1989
- Stilbops limneriaeformis (Schmiedeknecht, 1888)
- Stilbops mandibularis Kasparyan, 1999
- Stilbops mexicanus Townes, 1989
- Stilbops michinokuensis Watanabe & Maeto, 2012
- Stilbops montanus Watanabe & Maeto, 2012
- Stilbops obscurus Kasparyan, 1984
- Stilbops orientalis Kasparyan, 1984
- Stilbops plementaschi Hensch, 1930
- Stilbops pronotalis Kasparyan, 1984
- Stilbops quercicola Kasparyan, 1999
- Stilbops robustus Kasparyan, 1984
- Stilbops ruficornis (Gravenhorst, 1829)
- Stilbops vetulus (Gravenhorst, 1829)
